Phrynocephalus raddei is a species of agamid lizard found in Turkmenistan, Uzbekistan, Tajikistan, Iran, and Afghanistan.

References

raddei
Reptiles described in 1888
Taxa named by Oskar Boettger